Nemesio, from the Spanish name for Nemesis, is a Spanish given name. Notable people with the name include:
 Nemesio Oseguera Cervantes (July 17, 1966), Suspected founder and leader of multinational drug cartel CJNG
Nemesio Camacho (1869–1929), Colombian businessman and politician
Nemesio Canales (1878–1923), Puerto Rican writer and politician
Nemesio E. Caravana (1901–?), Filipino film director and actor
Nemesio Antúnez (1918–1993), Chilean painter
Nemesio Rivera Meza (1918-2007), Peruvian Roman Catholic bishop
Nemesio Prudente (1927–2008), Filipino educator and activist
Nemesio Fernández-Cuesta (1928–2009), Spanish businessman, journalist and politician
Nemesio Jiménez (born 1946), Spanish cyclist
Nemesio Miranda (born 1949), Filipino painter
Nemesio Domínguez Domínguez (born 1950), Mexican politician

See also
Vitorino Nemésio (1901–1978), Portuguese writer and intellectual

Spanish masculine given names